Championa suturalis is a species of beetle in the family Cerambycidae. It was described by Chemsak in 1967.

References

Heteropsini
Beetles described in 1967